The China Development Bank (CDB) is a development bank in the People's Republic of China (PRC), led by a cabinet minister at the Governor level, under the direct jurisdiction of the State Council. As one of three policy banks in China, it is responsible for raising funds for large-scale infrastructure projects, including the Three Gorges Dam and the Shanghai Pudong International Airport. Established by the Policy Banks Law of 1994, the bank is described as the engine that powers the national government's economic development policies.

Debts issued by the China Development Bank are owned by local banks and treated as risk-free assets under the proposed People's Republic of China capital adequacy rules (i.e. the same treatment as PRC government bonds). The bank is the second-largest bond issuer in China after the Ministry of Finance. In 2009, it accounted for about a quarter of the country's yuan bonds and is the biggest foreign-currency lender.

History 

The China Development Bank (CDB) was established in March 1994 to provide development-oriented financing for high-priority government projects. It is under the direct jurisdiction of the State Council and the People's Central Government. At present, it has 35 branches across the country and one representative office. The bank provides financing for national projects such as infrastructure development, basic industries, energy, and transportation.

The main objective as a state financial institution is to support the macroeconomic policies of the central government and to support national economic development and strategic structural changes in the economy.

In the last decade, CDB has issued 1.6 trillion yuan in loans to more than 4,000 projects involving infrastructure, communications, transportation, and basic industries. The investments are spread along the Yellow River, and both south and north of the Yangtze River. CDB has been increasingly focusing on developing the western and northwestern provinces in China. This could help reduce the growing economic disparity in the western provinces, and it has the potential to revitalize the old industrial bases of northeast China.

Since 1997, CDB has reduced bad debts, returning to profitability under Governor Chen Yuan, the eldest son of Chen Yun. Chen was formerly the executive deputy governor of the PRC's central bank, The People's Bank of China. International financial standards and better practices were introduced under his leadership.

CDB plays a major role in alleviating infrastructure and energy bottlenecks in the Chinese economy. In 2003, CDB made loan arrangements for, or evaluated and underwrote, a total of 460 national debt projects and issued 246.8 billion yuan in loans. This accounted for 41% of its total investment. CDB's loans to the "bottleneck" investments that the government prioritizes amounted to 91% of its total loan count. It also issued a total of 357.5 billion yuan in loans to western areas and more than 174.2 billion yuan to old industrial bases in Northeast China. These loans substantially increased the economic growth and structural readjustments of the Chinese economy.

At the end of 2004, the bank's total credit assets were RMB 1,378.6 billion, with a current principal and interest recovery ratio of 99.77%, after 20 consecutive quarters of world-class performance. The bank's non-performing loan ratio stood at 1.21%, a decrease of 0.13 percentage points year over year. The coverage ratio of its risk reserves against non-performing loans was 285%, and its capital adequacy ratio reached 10.51%. During 2004, the bank made a profit of about US$2 billion.

In 2005 and 2006, CDB successfully issued two pilot Asset-Backed Securities (ABS) products in the domestic China market. Along with other ABS products issued by China Construction Bank, CDB has created a foundation for a promising debt capital and structured finance market.

At the end of 2010, CDB held US$687.8 billion in loans, more than twice the amount of the World Bank.

As of December 2018, outstanding loans to 11 provincial-level regions along the belt amounted to 3.85 trillion yuan (about 575 billion U.S. dollars), according to the CDB. New yuan loans to these regions reached 304.5 billion yuan last year, accounting for 48 percent of the bank's total new yuan loans. The funds mainly went to major projects in the fields of ecological protection and restoration, infrastructure connectivity, and industrial transformation and upgrading. The CDB will continue to support ecological protection and green development of the Yangtze River in 2019, said CDB Chairman Zhao Huan. China issued a development plan for the Yangtze River Economic Belt in September 2016 and a guideline for green development of the belt in 2017. The Yangtze River Economic Belt consists of nine provinces and two municipalities that cover roughly one-fifth of China's land. It has a population of 600 million and generates more than 40 percent of the country's GDP.

Organizational structure 
The Governors of the bank report to a Board of Supervisors, who are accountable to the central government. There are four vice governors and two assistant governors.  At the end of 2004, CDB had about 3,500 employees. About 1,000 of CDB's employees work at the Beijing Headquarters, with the rest in 35 mainland branches; including a representative office in Tibet and a branch in Hong Kong.}

As of 2021, the CDB has more than 9,000 employees.

The bank does not take private savings, so it does not have local branches like many other major banks.

Subsidiaries
 China Development Bank International Investment

Management 

 Chairman Hu Huaibang, born in September 1955. Graduated with a Major in Studies of Money and Banking from Shaanxi Institute of Finance and Economics.
 Vice Chairman Zheng Zhijie, born in June 1958. Graduated with a Major in Infrastructure Financing from Liaoning Institute of Finance and Economics (now Dongbei University of Finance and Economics).
 Chairman of Supervisory Board Yao Zhongmin, born May 1952. Graduated with a Major in Infrastructure Financing from Liaoning Institute of Finance and Economics (now Dongbei University of Finance and Economics).
 Vice Governor Li Jiping, born in September 1955. Graduated with a Major in Infrastructure Financing from Liaoning Institute of Finance and Economics (now Dongbei University of Finance and Economics).
 Vice Governor Wang Yongsheng, born in January 1958. Graduated with a Major in Investment Economics from the Zhongnan University of Economics (now Zhongnan University of Economics and Law).
 Vice Governor Yuan Li, born in 1962. Graduated with a Doctorate in Finance from Peking University.

References

External links 
 Official website

 
Banks of China
Banks established in 1994
Chinese brands
Government agencies of China
State Council of the People's Republic of China
National development banks
Chinese companies established in 1994